Alexandrovka is a rural locality (a selo) in Alexandrovsky Selsoviet, Loktevsky District, Altai Krai, Russia. The population was 394 as of 2013. There are 9 streets.

Geography 
Alexandrovka is located on the Aley River, 33 km northeast of Gornyak (the district's administrative centre) by road. Pavlovka is the nearest rural locality.

References 

Rural localities in Loktevsky District